Kathi Kantha Rao (evadnaina madathetestadu) (Telugu: కత్తి కాంతా రావు: ఎవడ్నయినా మడతెట్టేస్తాడు) is a 2010 Telugu comedy film directed by E. V. V. Satyanarayana, produced by Eedara Srinivasa Rao, Eedara Ravikumar, Eedupuganti Subramanyeshwar Rao and Eedupuganti Purnachandra Rao under Big B Productions banner and starring Allari Naresh and Kamna Jethmalani in lead roles. The film soundtrack was composed by singer turned music composer Mallikarjun and Cinematography was handled by Adusumilli Vijay Kumar. Dialogues and Story for the movie were written by popular writer Prasad Varma. This was E. V. V. Satyanarayana's last movie as director before his death in 2011. This was also the ninth time that the father-son combo of E. V. V. Satyanarayana and Allari Naresh worked together for a movie. The movie was released on 10 December 2010.

Plot
Kathi Kantharao (Allari Naresh) is the son of a suspended gunman (Dharmavarapu Subramanyam). He is a police constable with two married sisters and another two sisters who are ready for marriage. He has to fulfill the desires of his two greedy brothers-in-law (Krishna Bhagavaan and Srinivas Reddy) and also search for grooms for his younger sisters. The whole family burden rests on his shoulders. He also signs an agreement with his father stating that he won’t marry until his sisters are happily settled in life. However, he deviates from the agreement by falling in love and eventually marrying a girl called Rathnam (Kamna Jethmalani). He decides to keep it a secret until he fulfills the word given to his father. Due to unexpected circumstances, he reveals his relationship with Rathnam to his boss and sub-inspector Kanakaratnam (Jeeva). In the meantime, one of his sisters falls in love with the IG G.K. Rayudu's (Chalapathi Rao) son, while another loves a constable and Katha Rao's friend Vaasu (Venu Madhav). Kantha Rao manages to settle the marriage of his two younger sisters with the people they love. Kanakaratnam to clear the doubts he has about their relationship goes to Rathnam's home town Vengalappagudem to meet with her father Ringu Raja Rao(Kota Srinivasa Rao). Raaja Rao learning about the marriage from Kanakaratnam goes to Hyderabad to confront his daughter. Kanta Rao manages to reveal the truth to Raja Rao and promises to remarry her with the blessings of his entire family. Ringu Raja Rao wants to become the sarpanch of a village and does all kinds of non-sense to appease the voters. As his opponent Lanka Satish's (Ahuti Prasad) son (Nalla Srinu) marries a foreigner, Raja Rao takes advantage and criticises their entire family for his political gain. After a few days, Kanta Rao convinces his parents and sisters and makes arrangements for his younger sisters marriage too and marries Rathnam. However, after the first night, Rathnam unintentionally reveals that she is pregnant. Lanka Satish learns about the pregnancy of Rathnam and defames Raja Rao so that he can win the village elections. With this, the winning chances of Raja Rao as sarpanch turn bleak, and is faced with the dilemma of finding a solution to this critical situation. Kantha Rao faces many troubles and finally solves all his problems and also helps Raja Rao win the village elections.

Cast 
 Allari Naresh as Katti Kantha Rao
 Kamna Jethmalani as Rathnam
 Kota Srinivasa Rao as Ringu Raja Rao
 Dharmavarapu Subramanyam as Katti Pulla Rao
 L.B. Sriram as Marriage Broker
 Krishna Bhagavaan as Kantha Rao's Brother-In-Law
 Venu Madhav as Vaasu
 Raghu Babu as Rao Gopal Sharma
 Jeeva as Sub-Inspector Kanakaratnam
 Ali as Blade Babji
 Kondavalasa Lakshmana Rao as Vaasu's Father
 Chalapathi Rao as Inspector General GK Rayudu
 Ahuti Prasad as Lanka Satish
 Duvvasi Mohan as Constable
 Dhanraj as Ringu Raja Rao's servant
 Nalla Venu as Nalla Sreenu
 Priya as Kantha Rao's sister
 Srinivasa Reddy as Kantha Rao's Brother-In-Law

Production
The director of this movie E. V. V. Satyanarayana and the lead pair Allari Naresh and Kamna Jethmalani had previously worked together in hit movie Bendu Apparao R.M.P. E.V.V known for his trademark comedy movies began working on the script of this movie in early 2010. He collaborated for the ninth time with his son Allari Naresh for this movie. This was Allari Naresh's seventh release in the year after Saradaga Kasepu. Kamna Jethmalani was cast for the role of Rathnam, daughter of a village politician. As most E.V.V movies do, the movie features most of the Telugu comedians like L.B. Sriram,  Jeeva, Kota Srinivasa Rao, Dharmavarapu Subramanyam, Krishna Bhagavaan, Venu Madhav, Raghu Babu, Ali, Kondavalasa Lakshmana Rao, Chalapati Rao, Ahuti Prasad, Duvvasi Mohan, Dhanraaj, Venu and Srinivas Reddy. Prasad Varma assisted E.V.V. with the dialogues in the movie. Shooting of the movie began in July 2010 and was completed in September 2010 and the movie was released in December 2010. The movie was censored and was given U/A certificate. Shooting was predominantly done in Hyderabad and Bangkok. Soon after the release, in January 2011 E.V.V. died making this his last movie.

Release and reception
The movie was released in India and Overseas on 10 December 2010. The movie was received with positive reviews. NDTV gave a good review for the movie and said the movie can be watched only for sheer entertainment value. Jeevi from Idlebrain gave the movie 3.0 of 5 rating and commented that the movie was an EVV brand comedy flick. Reviewer from Indiaglitz gave a very positive review of the movie and said that it was a 'paisa vasool' for comedy lovers. Radhika Rajamani from sify gave the movie 2 stars out of 5 and said that Katti Kanta Rao was an average time-pass entertainer. The movie fared very well at the box-office and was declared a hit in the year 2010.

Soundtrack

Audio release of the film was held on 24 November 2010 in Visakhapatnam. The audio was released and distributed under SVV Music label. The music of this movie was composed by singer turned composer Mallikarjun. This is Mallikarjun's first movie as a composer. The audio was well received. Ramajogayya Sastry penned 5 of the 6 songs in the movie while lyricist Vanamali penned the remaining one song.

References

External links 
 

2010 films
2010s Telugu-language films
Films directed by E. V. V. Satyanarayana